The 2015 V8 Supercars Dunlop Series was an Australian motor racing competition for V8 Supercars, staged as support series to the International V8 Supercars Championship. It was the sixteenth annual V8 Supercar Development Series and the fourth to be contested under the "Dunlop Series" name.

The series was won by Cameron Waters driving a Ford FG Falcon.

Teams and drivers
The following teams and drivers contested the 2015 V8 Supercars Dunlop Series:

The 2015 V8 Supercars Dunlop Series featured a new race number allocation system. Each year since the series began in 2000, the race number pool was shared with the main V8 Supercars Championship, meaning that numbers used in that series could not be used in the Dunlop Series. For 2015, an individual number pool was allocated to each series.

Calendar
The 2015 V8 Supercars Dunlop Series was contested over seven rounds. The calendar was released on 18 November 2014.

Note: In the above table, "Event" refers to the V8 Supercars Championship meeting at which the Dunlop Series round was contested.

Points system
Series points were awarded in each race as per the following:

Championship standings

See also
 2015 V8 Supercar season

References

External links
 

Supercars Development Series
Dunlop V8 Supercar Series